is a compilation album by Japanese duo Pink Lady, released on March 26, 2008. It was one of four Yū Aku Works compilation albums released by Victor Entertainment to honor songwriter Yū Aku, who died on August 1, 2007. The other three compilations were of Shinichi Mori, Hiromi Iwasaki, and Junko Sakurada.

The album was reissued on SACD+CD format on May 24, 2020.

Track listing 
All lyrics are written by Yū Aku. All music is composed and arranged by Shunichi Tokura, except where indicated.

References

External links

2008 compilation albums
Japanese-language compilation albums
Pink Lady (band) compilation albums
Victor Entertainment compilation albums